Setha M. Low (born March 14, 1948) is a former president of the American Anthropological Association, a professor in environmental psychology, and the director of the Public Space Research Group at the City University of New York. Low also served as a Conservation Guest Scholar at the Getty Conservation Institute.

Low received a B.A. in psychology from Pitzer College, Claremont, California in 1969 and her M.A. and Ph.D. in anthropology at the University of California, Berkeley in 1971 and 1976.

Her recent research includes an ethnography of residents in gated communities in San Antonio, Texas and on Long Island and a study of urban parks with case studies including New York City's Prospect Park, Orchard Beach in Pelham Bay Park, and Jacob Riis Park in the Gateway National Recreation Area. More broadly Low's research includes work on the anthropology of space and place, medical anthropology, urban anthropology, historic preservation, landscapes of fear, security/insecurity, and gating in Latin America, the United States, and the cities of Western Europe.

Low grew up in Los Angeles and currently resides in Brooklyn.

Publications 
 2022 Why Public Space Matters. Oxford University Press. ISBN 9780197543733. 
 2016 Spatializing Culture: The Ethnography of Space and Place. New York and London: Routledge.
 2006 The Politics of Public Space [with co-editor Neil Smith]. New York and London: Routledge.
 2005 Rethinking Urban Parks: Public Space and Cultural Diversity. University of Texas Press.
 2003 Behind the Gates: The New American Dream. New York and London: Routledge.
 2003 The Anthropology of Space and Place: Locating Culture [with co-author Denise Lawrence-Zuñiga]. Oxford: Blackwell.
 2000 On the Plaza: The Politics of Public Space and Culture. Austin: University of Texas Press.
 1999 Theorizing the City: The New Urban Anthropology Reader. New Brunswick: Rutgers University Press.
 1996 "Spatializing Culture: The Social Production and Social Construction of Public Space," American Ethnologist 23(4): 861–879.
 1995 Children of the Urban Poor: The Sociocultural Environment of Growth, Development and Malnutrition in Guatemala City [with co-author F. Johnston]. Boulder: Westview.
 1995 "Indigenous Architectural Representations: Mesoamerican and Caribbean Foundations of the Spanish American Plaza," American Anthropologist 97(4): 748–762.

References

External links 
 Setha M. Low, Professor of Anthropology, The Graduate Center, CUNY
 Setha Low speaks about public space at House of Speakeasy's Seriously Entertaining

1948 births
Living people
American women anthropologists
American anthropologists
21st-century American psychologists
American women psychologists
Environmental psychologists
21st-century American women
20th-century American psychologists